Lorri Bagley (born August 5, 1973) is an American actress and model.

Life and career
Lorri Bagley became a model in Europe by the age of fourteen, working for the likes of Dior, Chanel, and Issey Miyake as well as notably modelling for Victoria's Secret for five years. Bagley made her television debut at a young age appearing on Late Night with David Letterman in 1982.

She dated Chris Farley in 1993, and both starred and shared a brief scene together in the 1995 comedy film Tommy Boy.

She has appeared in other films such as Mickey Blue Eyes, and television productions such as 22 episodes of Veronica's Closet.

Filmography
Tommy Boy (1995) - Woman at Pool
Kingpin (1996) - Beautiful Dancer
The Deli (1997) - One-A-Day Girl
54 (1998) - Patti
Celebrity (1998) - Gina
As the World Turns (1 episode, 1998) (TV) - Lacey
Mickey Blue Eyes (1999) - Antoinette
Spin City (1 episode, 1999) (TV) - Mitsy
Trick (1999) - Judy
The Crew (2000/I) - Sofa Girl
Veronica's Closet (20 episodes, 1999–2000) (TV) - June Bilson Anderson
Third Watch (1 episode, 2001) (TV) - Bosco's Neighbor
Peroxide Passion (2001) - Mimi
B.S. (2002) (TV) - Hope Fisk
Ice Age (2002) - Jennifer (voice) 
Poster Boy (2004) - Dierdre
The Stepford Wives (2004) - Charmaine Van Sant
I Am Chris Farley (2015) - Herself

Recognition
For her work in Peroxide Passion, Todd Anthony of Sun-Sentinel referred to Bagley as a "Star on the Horizon award-winner".

Awards and nominations
2001, President Award, Ft. Lauderdale International Film Festival
2001, Best Actress, The B-Movie Theater Film Fest

References

External links
 
 

1973 births
Living people
Actresses from Dallas
Female models from Texas
American film actresses
American television actresses
20th-century American actresses
21st-century American actresses